Benjamin Lah (born 10 November 1985) is a slovenian martial artist who represents his native country Slovenia in sport jujitsu (JJIF).

Career 
He was starting training judo at age of 11 in hometown Celje. He was trained by famous Slovenian coach Marjan Fabjan but he never reached the highest international level in judo. In late 2005 he switched for sport jujitsu. His native country Slovenia hosted European Championships in 2011 in city Maribor and under supervision of coach Marko Gaber he won his first European title front of home crowd. He is also world champion in sport ju-jitsu from 2016 in Wrocław in discipline FIghting System, category −94 kg.

Results

Links

References

1985 births
Living people
Slovenian martial artists
World Games bronze medalists
Competitors at the 2017 World Games